The Nelson Twins (or Nelson Twins, Nelson Bros) are an Australian-based stand-up comedy duo consisting of identical twins Chris and Justin Nelson.

Early life
The brothers grew up in New South Wales. They debuted their comedy act in 2006, and reached the grand finals of that year's city of Melbourne’s Angling for a Laugh comedy store  competition with a performance designed to draw on their own experiences, growing up in their time and as identical twins.

References

Living people
Australian male comedians
Year of birth missing (living people)